Sheikh K. A. Amir Abedi (1924–1964) was the first African mayor of Dar es Salaam.

He served as a Minister of Justice and as Minister of Education and Culture, as well as led the Tanganyikan delegation to the Eighteenth Session of the United Nations General Assembly.

Death 
Abedi was also a skilled and prominent poet of the Swahili language and also a strong promoter of the  Swahili language. He died of food poisoning in 1964 at the age of 40.

See also
 List of mayors of Dar es Salaam
 Timeline of Dar es Salaam

References

1924 births
1964 deaths
Mayors of Dar es Salaam
Tanzanian Ahmadis
Government ministers of Tanganyika
Permanent Representatives of Tanganyika to the United Nations